The 2011 FIFA Beach Soccer World Cup qualifiers for UEFA was a beach soccer tournament played in Bibione, Italy from July 11–18, 2010, which determined the four teams that qualified to the 2011 FIFA Beach Soccer World Cup in Ravenna, Italy. All matches were played at a temporary stadium on the beach at Piazzale Zenith in Bibione. The draw for the group stage of the competition was made at the end of June, 2010.

The nations who reached the semi-finals of the tournament achieved qualification for the world cup who were Russia, Ukraine, Switzerland and Portugal. This meant that Spain, who won the 2008 qualifying championship and who came second in 2009, did not even manage to qualify from this year's event for the next world cup, meaning the 2011 world cup will be the first time Spain have not competed in 12 world cups, since the 1997 Beach Soccer World Cup. The overall winners of the tournament, and surprise winners were Ukraine.

By the end of the tournament, over 82,000 people had attended the games at Piazzale Zenith, and over 200,000 people watched the games online.

Participating teams
27 teams confirmed their participation in the competition, the highest ever amount for a world cup qualifier, with several newcomers, showing the ever growing popularity of the sport:

Group stage
The 27 teams were drawn into 6 groups of 4 teams and one group of 3 teams. The group games took place over a period of three days. The top two teams in the groups automatically qualified for the knockout stage of the tournament. Then, the two best performing teams who finished third in their group were chosen to play in the knockout stage, to make up the numbers.

Group A

MATCHES:

Group B

Group C

Group D

Group E

Group F

Group G

Notes:

A  Italy have already qualified to the 2011 FIFA Beach Soccer World Cup as they are the hosts. In case Italy finishes in the top 4, Europe's fifth berth will be given to the team that finishes fifth in the qualifiers.
B  Team won in extra time, therefore 2 points are awarded to the winning side, instead of 3.
C  Team won on penalties, therefore 2 points are awarded to the winning side, instead of 3.

Knockout stage
The draw for the knockout stage was made after the preliminary round of games was completed on 13 July. All kickoff times are listed as Italian summer time, (UTC+2).

Round of 16

Quarter finals

Semi finals

Third place play off

Final

Winners

Awards

Teams Qualifying

References

Squads
Schedule
Beach Soccer Worldwide reports:
Web reports: Day 1, Day 2, Day 3, Day 4, Day 5, Day 6, Day 7.
PDF reports: Day 1, Day 2, Day 3, Day 5, Day 6.

2010 in Italian sport
Qualification Uefa
2011
International association football competitions hosted by Italy
2010 in beach soccer